This is a list of notable automobile manufacturers with articles on Wikipedia by country.  It includes companies that are in business as well as defunct manufacturers.  Only companies that have articles here are included.

A

Algeria

 SNVI

Argentina

 Zanella
 Koller

Defunct

 Anasagasti
 AutoLatina
 Autoar
 Crespi
 Eniak
 Hispano-Argentina
 IAVA
 IAME
 IKA
 Sevel Argentina
 SIAM Di Tella

Armenia

Defunct

 ErAZ

Australia

 ACE EV Group
 Borland Racing Developments
 Bolwell
 Brabham Automotive
 Ford Australia
 General Motors Special Vehicles (GMSV)
 Elfin Sports Cars

Defunct

 Ford Performance Vehicles (FPV)
 Giocattolo
 Holden

Austria

 KTM
 Magna Steyr
 Puch
 Tushek & Spigel

Defunct

 Austro-Daimler
 Austro-Tatra
 Denzel
 Felber
 Libelle
 Lohner–Porsche
 Möve
 ÖAF (merged into MAN SE)
 Steyr
 Steyr-Daimler-Puch

Azerbaijan

 AzSamand
 Ganja Auto Plant
 Nakhchivan Automobile Plant

B

Bangladesh

 BMTF

Belarus

 BelAZ
 BelGee
 MAZ
 MoAZ
 MZKT
 Neman

Belgium

Current

 Gillet
 Van Hool

Defunct

 Auto-Mixte
 FN
 Imperia
 Métallurgique
 Minerva
 Nagant
 Pieper

Brazil

Current

 Agrale
 Comil
 Marcopolo
 Mascarello
 Neobus
 TAC

Defunct

 Brasinca
 Busscar
 Dacon
 Engesa
 FNM
 Farus
 Gurgel
 HTT
 Hofstetter
 JPX
 Lobini
 Obvio!
 Puma
 Romi
 Santa Matilde
 Troller
 Vemag

Bulgaria

Current
Litex
SIN

Defunct

Bulgaralpine
Bulgarrenault
Moskvych
Pirin-Fiat
Sofia

C

Canada

Current

Bombardier
Campagna
Felino Corporation
Intermeccanica
INKAS
New Flyer
Nova Bus
Prevost
Terradyne

Defunct

Acadian
Asüna
Beaumont
Bricklin
Brooks
Can-Am
Dennis
Derby
Dupont
Dynasty
Envoy
Frontenac
Gray-Dort
Hayes Trucks
Manic
McLaughlin
Meteor
Monarch
Orion
Pacific Trucks
Passport
Redpath
Russell
Studebaker
ZENN

China

Current

Arcfox
Aion
Apex Motors
BAIC
Baojun
BAW
Bestune
Brilliance
BYD
Changan
Changhe
Chery
CNHTC
Dongfeng
Englon
EuAuto
Everus
FAW
Hongqi
Foton
GAC Fiat
Geely
Gonow
Great Wall
Hafei
Haima
Hanteng
Hawtai
Haval
Heibao
Higer
JAC Motors
Jiangling
Jinbei
Jonway
Karry
Landwind
Leahead
Lifan
Li Auto
Luxgen
Nio
Qoros
Roewe
SAIC
Sehol
Shacman
Soueast
Trumpchi
Wuling
Voyah
Xpeng
Yudo Auto
Yutong
Zhongtong Bus
Zinoro
Zotye
ZX Auto

Defunct
Emgrand
Dadi Auto
Venucia

Croatia

DOK-ING
Rimac

Czech Republic

Current

 Škoda
 Tatra
 Avia
 Kaipan
 MTX
 Praga

Defunct

 Aero
 Jawa
 LIAZ
 Velorex
 Walter Fiat

D

Denmark
 Zenvo

E

Ethiopia

 Marathon Motors Engineering
 Holland Car (defunct)

F

Finland

 Valmet Automotive
 Electric Raceabout
 Toroidion
 Sisu Auto

France

Current

 Aixam
 Alpine
 Auverland
 Bolloré
 Bugatti
 Citroën
 Exagon
 Ligier
 Microcar
 Méga
 Peugeot
 PGO
 Renault
 Venturi

Defunct

 Aérocarène
 Bellanger
 Berliet
 Chenard-Walcker
 Decauville
 De Dion-Bouton
 Delage
 Delahaye
 Delaunay-Belleville
 Facel Vega
 Helicron
 Hommell
 Lorraine-Dietrich
 Matra
 Mors
 Panhard
 Rochet-Schneider
 Simca
 Talbot
 Talbot-Lago

G

Germany

Current

 Alpina
 Apollo
 Artega
 Audi
 Bitter
 BMW
 Daimler Truck
 Fuso
 Isdera
 Lotec
 MAN
 Mercedes-Benz
 Multicar
 Neoplan
 Opel
 Ruf
 Porsche
 Setra
 Smart
 Volkswagen
 Wiesmann

Defunct

 Adler
 AGA
 Auto Union
 AWS
 AWZ
 Barkas
 Borgward
 Brennabor
 Büssing
 Dauer
 DKW
 Glas
 Goliath
 Gumpert
 Hanomag
 Hansa
 Heinkel
 Horch
 Karmann
 Lloyd
 Maybach
 Melkus
 Messerschmitt
 NAG
 NSU
 Robur
 Simson
 Stoewer
 Tempo
 Trabant
 Wanderer
 Wartburg
 Zundapp

Ghana
 Kantanka

Greece

Current

 ELVO
 Korres
 Namco
 Replicar Hellas
 Sfakianakis
 Tangalakis-Temax

Defunct

 Alta
 Attica
 Autokinitoviomihania Ellados
 Automeccanica
 Balkania
 BET
 Biamax
 BIOMAN
 DIM
 MAVA-Renault
 MEBEA
 Neorion
 Pan-Car
 Theologou

I

India

Current

 Ajanta Group
 Ashok Leyland
 Asia MotorWorks
 Atul Auto
 AVANI
 Bajaj
 Eicher
 Force
 Hindustan
 Hradyesh
 ICML
 KAL
 Mahindra
 Maruti Suzuki
 Omega Seiki Mobility
 Tara International
 Tata
 TVS

Defunct

 Chinkara
 Hero
 Ideal Jawa
 Kinetic Engineering Limited
 Lohia Machinery
 Mopeds India Limited
 Premier
 Sipani
 Standard
 Swaraj Mazda

Ireland

Defunct

TMC
Alesbury
Shamrock (car)

Indonesia

Current
Astra International
Indomobil Group
Esemka
Pindad

Defunct
Timor

Iran

 Bahman
 Iran Khodro
 Kish Khodro
 MVM
 Pars Khodro
 SAIPA

Israel

Current

 Autocars
 Carmor
 Plasan

Defunct
 AIL

Italy

Current

 Abarth
 Alfa Romeo
 Bremach
 Casalini
 Covini
 CTS
 DR Motor
 Ducati
 Ferrari
 Fiat
 Iso
 Italdesign
 Iveco
 Lancia
 Lamborghini
 Maserati
 Mazzanti
 Minardi
 Pagani
 Piaggio
 Pininfarina
 Vespa
 Zagato

Defunct

 APIS
 Ansaldo
 Aquila
 A.S.A.
 A.T.S.
 Autobianchi
 Aurea
 Bandini
 Bertone 
 Bizzarrini
 Ceirano
 Chiribiri
 Cisitalia
 Cizeta
 De Tomaso
 Diatto
 FCA
 F.L.A.G.
 Fornasari
 Innocenti
 Intermeccanica
 Iso Milano
 Isotta Fraschini
 Itala
 Junior
 Lambretta
 LMX
 Marca-Tre-Spade
 Moretti
 Nardi
 O.M.
 O.S.C.A.
 Qvale
 Scuderia Ferrari
 Rapid
 S.C.A.T.
 Siata
 S.P.A.
 Stanguellini
 Storero
 Vignale
 Volugrafo
 Zust

J

Japan

Current

 Acura
 Aspark
 Autobacs Seven
 Daihatsu
 Dome
 GLM
 Hino
 Honda
 Infiniti
 Isuzu
 Kawasaki
 Lexus
 Mazda
 Mitsubishi Motors
 Mitsubishi Fuso
 Mitsuoka
 Nissan
 Subaru
 Suzuki
 Tommykaira
 Toyota
 UD Trucks
 Yamaha

Defunct

 Asahi
 Autozam
 Datsun
 Eunos
 Ohta
 Otomo
 Prince

K

Kenya
 Mobius Motors

L

Latvia
Current

 Dartz

Defunct
 Ford-Vairogs
 RAF (Latvija)

Lebanon
 W Motors

Liechtenstein
 Orca Engineering (Defunct)
 Jehle (Defunct)

Luxembourg
 MDI

M

Malaysia

 Bufori
 DefTech
 Inokom
 Modenas
 Naza
 Perodua
 Proton

Mexico

 DINA
 Mastretta
 VUHL
 Ramirez (defunct)
 VAM (defunct)

Monaco
 Venturi

Morocco

 Laraki
 Renault Somaca
 Fiat Somaca (defunct)

Myanmar
 Shan Star

N

Netherlands

 Burton
 Carver
 DAF
 Dakar
 Donkervoort
 Spijkstaal
 Spyker
 Stellantis (Multi-National)
 Vandenbrink
 VDL Berkhof
 Vencer

New Zealand

 Anziel
 Saker Cars
 Trekka

Nigeria
 Innoson Motors
 DFM

North Korea

 Pyeonghwa Motors
 Sungri Motors
 Samhung Motors

Norway
 Buddy (defunct)
 Think  (defunct)

P

Pakistan

Current

 Heavy Industries Taxila
 Sazgar
 United Auto Industries

Defunct

 Adam Motor Company
 Dewan Farooque Motors
 Nexus Automotive

Philippines

Almazora Motors
Del Monte Motors
Sarao Motors
Delta (defunct)

Poland

Current

 AMZ
 Arrinera
 Autosan 
 Jelcz
 Solaris
 Ursus

Defunct

 FSC Żuk
 FSM
 FSO
 FSR Tarpan
 Intrall
 Polski Fiat
 Star
 Syrena
 Warszawa
 ZSD Nysa

Portugal

 Vinci
 Bravia (defunct)
 Portaro (defunct)
 UMM (defunct)
 Edfor (defunct)

R

Romania

Current

 Dacia
 ROMAN

Defunct

 ARO 
 Oltcit 
 Rocar

Russia

Current

 Avtotor
 GAZ
 IZh
 Kamaz
 Lada
 LiAZ
 PAZ
 Sollers
 UAZ

Defunct

 Amur
 Avtoframos
 Derways
 GAZ (Volga)
 Marussia
 Moskvitch
 Russo-Balt
 SeAZ
 SMZ
 TagAZ
 Yo-Mobile
 ZiL

S

Saudi Arabia
 KSU Gazal-1

Serbia

 FAP
 FAS
 Ikarbus
 IMT
 Neobus(defunct)
 Zastava (defunct)
 IDA (defunct)
 Yugo (defunct)

Slovenia

Current
 Adria Mobil
 Tushek & Spigel

Defunct
 TAM

South Africa

Current

Advanced Automotive Design
Perana Performance Group

Defunct

AAD

South Korea

Current

 CT&T United
 Daewoo Bus
 Genesis
 GM Korea
 Hyundai
 Kia
 Renault Samsung
 SsangYong
 Tata Daewoo

Defunct

 Asia Motors
 Daewoo
 Keohwa
 Proto
 Saehan
 Samsung
 Shinjin
 Sibal

Spain

 Abadal
 Aspid
 Cupra
 GTA
 Irizar
 SEAT
 Spania
 Tauro
 Tramontana
 Uro
 Hispano Suiza

Sri Lanka
 Kapla Motor Industries
 Micro
 Vega EVX

Sweden

Current

 Koenigsegg
 NEVS
 Polestar
 Scania
 Uniti
 Volvo Buses
 Volvo Cars
 Volvo Trucks

Defunct

 Jösse Car
 Saab (Present name NEVS)

Switzerland

Current

Leblanc
Rinspeed
 Sbarro

Defunct

 Enzmann
 Martini
 Monteverdi
 Pic-Pic
 Soletta

T

Taiwan

 CMC
 Luxgen
 Yulon

Thailand

 Thai Rung

Tunisia
 Wallyscar

Turkey

Current

 BMC
 Diardi
 Erkunt
 Etox
 Fiat-Tofaş
 FNSS
 Guleryuz
 Karsan
 Otokar
 Özaltin
 Pancar Motor
 Temsa
 Togg
 Anadol (defunct)
 Devrim (defunct)

U

Ukraine

Bohdan
Etalon
KrAZ
LAZ
ZAZ
LuAZ (now part of Bogdan)

United Arab Emirates

 W Motors

 Ajlani Motors

United Kingdom

Current

 AC
 Alexander Dennis
 Apex Motors
 Ariel
 Aston Martin
 Atalanta Motors
 BAC
 Bentley
 Bowler
 Caterham
Crosslé
 David Brown Automotive
 Ginetta
 GKD
 GMA
 Grinnall
 Healey
 Jaguar
 Lagonda
 Larmar
 Land Rover
 Lister
 Lotus
 McLaren
 MG
 Mini
 Modec
 Morgan
 Noble
 Radical Sportscars
 Rolls-Royce
 Ronart Cars
 TVR
 Ultima Sports
 Vauxhall
 Westfield

Defunct

 Adam's Brothers
 AEC
 Allard
 Alvis
 Austin
 Austin-Healey
 British Leyland
 Bristol
 Daimler
 Donald Healey
 Elva
 Gordon Keeble
 Hillman
 Humber
 Jensen
 Jowett
 Lanchester
 Marcos
 Morris
 Panther Westwinds
 Reliant Motors
 Riley
 Rootes
 Rover
 Sharps Commercials Ltd
 Singer
 Standard
 Sunbeam
 Trident Cars
 Triumph
 Trojan
 Wolseley

United States

Current

 All American Racers
 AM General
 Anteros Coachworks
 Aptera
 Arcimoto
 Autocar
 Bremach
 Buick
 Cadillac
 Callaway
 Canoo
 Chevrolet
 Chrysler
 Detroit Electric
 Dodge
 E-Z-GO
 ElDorado
 ENC
 Falcon Motorsports
 Faraday
 FCA
 Fisker
 Ford
 Freightliner
 Gillig
 GM
 Google
 GEM
 GMC
 Hennessey
 Jeep
 Karma
 Kenworth
 Lincoln
 Lordstown Motors
 Lucid Motors
 Mack
 MCI
 Navistar
 Nikola Motor
 Oshkosh
 Panoz
 Peterbilt
 Pierce
 Polaris
 Proterra
 Ram
 RAESR
 Rezvani Motors
 Rivian
 Rossion
 Saleen
 SCG
 Shelby 
 SRT
 SSC
 Tesla
 Thomas Built Buses
 Trion Supercars
 VLF Automotive
 Western Star
 Workhorse

Defunct

 Adams-Farwell
 Alco
 AMC
 Amplex
 Apollo
 Apperson
 Aptera
 ArBenz
 Auburn
 Avanti Motor Company
 Baker Electric
 Bates
 Brush
 Cartercar
 Chalmers
 Chandler
 Chaparral Cars
 Checker
 Clénet
 Cole
 Columbia
 Continental
 Cord
 Crawford
 Crosley
 Cutting
 Daniels
 Davis
 Devon
 DeLorean
 DeSoto
 Diamond Reo Trucks
 Doble
 Dorris
 Dort
 Duesenberg
 Durant
 Dymaxion
 Eagle
 Edsel
 Elgin
 Essex
 Excalibur
 Flint
 Frazer
 Frontenac
 Gardner
 Geo
 Graham-Paige
 Grumman
 Haynes
 Hudson
 Hummer
 Hupmobile
 Hupp-Yeats
 Imperial
 International Harvester
 Inter-State
 Jackson
 Jeffery
 Kaiser
 King
 Kissel
 Kline Kar
 Knox
 LaFayette
 Laforza
 Lambert
 LaSalle
 Lexington
 Local
 Locomobile
 Lozier
 Lyons-Knight
 Marmon (Cars)
 Marmon (Trucks)
 Marmon-Herrington
 Maxwell
 McFarlan
 Mercury
 Mitchell
 Monarch
 Monroe
 Moon
 Mosler
 Nash
 National
 Nyberg
 Oakland
 Oldsmobile
 Overland
 Packard
 Peerless
 Pierce-Arrow
 Pilot
 Plymouth
 Pontiac
 Pope-Toledo
 Pope-Tribune
 Premier
 Pungs Finch
 Rambler
 Rauch and Lang
 Regal
 REO
 Safari Coach
 Saturn
 Scion
 Scripps-Booth
 Simplex
 Speedwell
 Stanley
 Star
 Stearns-Knight
 Sterling
 Sterling Trucks
 Stevens-Duryea
 Stoddard-Dayton
 Studebaker
 Stutz
 TH!NK
 Thomas
 Tucker
 Vector
 VPG
 Velie
 Westcott
 White
 Willys
 Zimmer

Uruguay
 Effa

Uzbekistan

 SAZ
 GM Uzbekistan

V

Venezuela

Current

 Venirauto

Vietnam
 VinFast

Current

Thaco
Mekong Auto
VinFast
World Auto

Defunct
 Vinaxuki

See also

List of Asian automobile manufacturers
List of car brands
List of current automobile manufacturers by country
List of manufacturers by motor vehicle production
List of European automobiles
Timeline of motor vehicle brands

References